The Western North Carolina Nature Center is a  zoological park in Western North Carolina operated by the City of Asheville's Parks and Recreation department. It received its current name in 1974 when formed as a non-profit charity to develop the zoo which ultimately opened in 1976. The Center has been accredited by the Association of Zoos and Aquariums since 1999 and its collection features animals native to the southern Appalachian Mountains. In 2013 the center welcomed over 107,000 guests with over 13,000 coming from school children on field trips to the facility.

In 2010, the Center completed an ambitious 2020 Vision master plan, and in 2013 opened the first phase of this plan with a red wolf exhibit that is part of the Association of Zoos and Aquariums' species survival plan and Arachnid Adventure playground. 

As both visitation at the WNC Nature Center and wildlife rehabilitation needs in the area grew, the need for a dedicated facility outside the center became clear. Appalachian Wildlife Refuge was established in the fall of 2014 to fulfill this role and, by summer of 2018, began serving as the primary coordinator for all injured and orphaned wildlife in the region. 

A new front entrance complex was opened in September 2018. The following February, the Red Pandas became the first of the prehistoric Appalachian animals. The Prehistoric Appalachia exhibits will feature animals – or their closest living relatives – found in the region 15,000 years ago based on excavations done at the Gray Fossil Site, such as red panda (closest living relative of the Bristol's panda),. Other animals found at the fossil site include tapir, wolverine, and rhinoceros.

The center's library pass partnership was expanded to 9 local counties in 2022. A limited number of free passes are available by advanced reservation at local library branches to library card holders through these partnerships.

References

Buildings and structures in Asheville, North Carolina
Zoos in North Carolina
Nature centers in North Carolina
Tourist attractions in Asheville, North Carolina